African Journey: A Search for the Roots is a blues album by an American historian Samuel Charters and an attempt to trace the roots and influences of American blues from the 1920s and 1930s back to the tribal music of West Africa. He draws connections and similarities through song content and instrument type and usage. In 1974 he traveled the length of the crescent from Senegal to Nigeria. He then returned to travel up the Gambia River to a slave pen at Jang Jang Bure. His travel path emulated the paths of slave traders. All the musical performances were recorded by means of a tape recorder. The album was released as a double vinyl set. Volume One contains songs performed by historians as well as celebratory songs from The Gambia, Senegal, and Mali. Volume Two consists of funeral processions, dances, and songs from Ghana, Togo and The Gambia.

Album Information: An Introduction and Notes to the Songs 

The back cover of the album entitled: An Introduction and Notes to the Songs explains why he chose the area of West Africa for his research and how he drew connections between West African music and the American delta blues.

He explains that up the point the project was undertaken records of African slave heritage were insufficient and provided little evidence as to where and individual slave or family was from. This coupled with the fact that the slaves themselves came from cultures without written languages and without a clear idea of larger geographic areas, made it almost impossible to trace individual slave's roots. He then explains that the current research of his time has allowed historians to understand which tribes and peoples came from what areas and what music, language, and culture they brought. With this research he was able to draw the initial connection between the blues and traditional African music.

He then begins to distinguish between the first slaves arriving from Senegal, The Gambia and Guinea, and the later slaves coming from Ghana, Nigeria, and the Cameroons. The first group had established a distinctive Afro-American culture as they came to the colonies in groups and built the plantations. The second group was dispersed throughout the already formed plantations and they adapted to the established culture they found in America. From this he draws the conclusion that Afro-American music could be traced back to the area between the Senegal River and southern Guinea.

Then he discusses the distribution of individual tribes in the colonies. Because the Europeans generally didn't actually capture the slaves, who was shipped to the colonies was in the hands of the African rulers. At the time of the slave trades, West Africa was in constant internal struggle so it was the losers of the wars that were enslaved. Thus, tribes of fierce warriors were hardly ever found in America. Two tribes that were often found in slave colonies were the Wollofs and the Mandingoes.

The end of the introduction draws the connection between these tribes and the blues of America. These areas contained music with stringed instruments and there was also a strong tradition of the singer/historian, or griot,  whose role in the society closely paralleled that of the bluesman.

Songs

Volume One

Side One 
Track 1: Kelefa Ba

Artists: Jali Nyama Suso

Instruments: Kora, vocals

Notes: Jali Nyama Suso played the Kora while a performer improvised his own texts around basic song materials.

Track 2: Alfa Yaya

Artists: Abdoulie Samba

Instruments: Xalam, vocals

Notes: Alfa Yaya is a praise song to a king of the Wollof.

Track 3: Jola Dance

Artists: Individuals not recorded. The dance was performed by many members of the tribe.

Instruments: Drums, Hand and Wooden Clappers, vocals

Notes: Tied directly to the Juba Dance of the colonies.

Track 4: Chedo

Artists: Jali Nyama Suso

Instruments: Kora, vocals

Notes: Chedo is the Fula word for Mandingo and this song describes the war between the Fula and Mandingo.

Side Two 
Track 1: Bowdi

Artists: Alhaji Amara Sahone

Instruments: Konting, vocals

Notes: The konting is a larger xalam.

Track 2: Almami Samari Touray

Artists: Alhaji Fabala Kanuteh

Instruments: Balafon, vocals

Notes: Almami Samari Touray was a leader of Guinea during wartimes in the 19th Century.

Volume Two

Side Three 
Track 1: Tutu Jara

Artists: Dela Kanuteh, Mawdo Suso, Karunka Suso

Instruments: Balafon, kora, vocals

Notes: The song chronicles a woman who wants to have a child but has to ask a snake for help.

Track 2: Yaha Yaha

Artist: Alhaji Sait Camara

Instruments: Xalam, vocals

Notes: Yaha Yaha is a praise for the President of Gambia.

Side Four 
Track 1: Selati Nalim Koye

Artists: Falie Kuyateh

Instruments: Kora, vocals

Notes:  Selati Nalim Koye is about a great warrior in Mandingo history.

Track 2: Ewe Drumming

Artists: Collective tribe.

Instruments: Drums, vocals

Notes: The recording is only a short period taken from a day-long drumming ceremony.

References 

 African Journey: A Search for the Roots of the Blues: Album format, Samuel Charters, Vanguard Records, 1975
 The Roots of the Blues: An African Search, Samuel Charters, Da Capo Press, 1981

1975 compilation albums
Blues compilation albums
Folk compilation albums
albums produced by Samuel Charters